Brady Kurtz (born 27 September 1996) is a motorcycle speedway rider from Australia.

Biography
Born in Cowra, New South Wales, Kurtz isn't the only racer in his family. Brady's older brother Todd Kurtz is a fellow Speedway rider.

Brady got his first break into British Speedway riding in the Premier League with the Somerset Rebels. After 2 impressive years with the Rebels, Kurtz was named in the Poole Pirates team to compete in the 2016 Elite League. This news didn't come as a surprise, as Kurtz had already been the subject of interest from Poole for some time. The Poole promoter Matt Ford had gone on record lauding Kurtz as an "outstanding talent" that "every single club wants to snap up as an asset". Kurtz said of his future team "I have been looking up to the Poole Pirates since I was seven years old and used to watch them on TV all the time. To have Matt Ford looking at me and saying those things is like a dream come true."

Kurtz was the 2016 Australian Champion having won the 4 round series in January 2016. He is taking part in the qualifying rounds for Grand Prix entry.

In 2020, he signed for the Belle Vue Aces in the SGB Premiership. In 2022, he captained Belle Vue to the league title during the SGB Premiership 2022.

In 2023, he re-signed for Belle Vue again for the SGB Premiership 2023.

World final appearances

Individual Under-21 World Championship
2015 -  /  /  - 8th - 22pts

Under-21 Speedway World Cup
 2015 -  Mildura, Olympic Park Speedway - 3rd - 29pts (7)
 2016 -  Norrköping, Vargarna Speedway - 2nd - 37pts (7)

Speedway Grand Prix results

References

1996 births
Living people
Australian speedway riders
Belle Vue Aces riders
Plymouth Gladiators speedway riders
Poole Pirates riders
Somerset Rebels riders
Sportsmen from New South Wales
People from Cowra